Tangwani , is a small city and a tehsil in the Kashmor District of Sindh.  

The headquarters is Kandhkot. Tangwani, Ghouspur, Bakhshapur and Badani are also the parts of Kandhkot City Pakistan. It is located at 28°17'0N 69°0'0E with an altitude of 69 metres (229 feet). According to the 2017 census, Tangwani taluka resided 289,259 people. Zip code of Tangwani is 79150.

References

Kashmore District
Talukas of Sindh